This article refers to one of the former prefectures of Chad. From 2002 the country was divided into 18 regions.

Logone Oriental was one of the 14 prefectures of Chad. Located in the southwest of the country, Logone Oriental covered an area of 28,035 square kilometers and had a population of 441,064 in 1993. Its capital was Doba.

References

Prefectures of Chad

fr:Logone Oriental